Panch Padariya is a small village in Rohat tehsil, Pali district of Rajasthan. It is connected to two major cities, Pali and Jodhpur, by road. In the 2011 census its population was reported as 1,751.

References

Villages in Pali district